Mark Spragg (born 1952) is an American writer. He is the author of three   novels and one book of nonfiction, mostly set in Wyoming, where he grew up.

Biography 
Mark Spragg grew up on the Crossed Sabers Ranch, a Wyoming dude ranch eight miles east of Yellowstone National Park. He graduated from the University of Wyoming in Laramie in 1974, with a major in English. He worked on an oil rig, shoed horses, and led pack trips to support his writing.

In 1999 he published a memoir, Where Rivers Change Direction, about his unusual childhood, with no TV or radio but surrounded by vast expanses of rugged outdoor beauty. The book received starred reviews in Publishers Weekly and Library Journal, and won the 2000 Mountains and Plains Booksellers Award for Nonfiction

Spragg later published the novels The Fruit of Stone, An Unfinished Life, and Bone Fire. He also co-wrote the screenplay to An Unfinished Life with his wife, Virginia Korus Spragg.

He lives with his wife, Virginia, in Red Lodge, Montana.

Works

Novels 

The Fruit of Stone. Riverhead Hardcover, 2002. Highbridge Audiobook, 2003. Riverhead Trade, 2003. Vintage Contemporaries, 2011.  Reviewed in  the Economist   and Publishers Weekly  ". According to  WorldCat, the book is held in 817 libraries.

An Unfinished Life. Knopf, 2004. Vintage, 2005. . Reviewed in the New York Times by  Claire Dederer and USA Today   According to WorldCat, the book is held in 1342 libraries.

Bone Fire. Knopf, 2010. Vintage, 2011.  Reviewed in  Outside Magazine  and  Library Journal s " According to  WorldCat, the book is held in 829 libraries.

Nonfiction 
Where Rivers Change Direction. University of Utah Hardcover, 1999. Riverhead Paperback, 2000.  This books was reviewed in Publishers Weekly  "  and Library Journal  " According to  WorldCat, the book is held in 805 libraries

References 

 Susan Gray Gose, “Mark Spragg: The Useful Life,” Mark Spragg: The Useful Life. Retrieved February 13, 2016.
 “Mark Spragg - 1974” University of Wyoming Notable Alumni, . Retrieved February 13, 2016.
 “Mark Spragg” Penguin Random House authors. Mark Spragg | Penguin Random House. Retrieved February 13, 2016.
 “An Unfinished Life,” An Unfinished Life. Retrieved February 13, 2016.

External links 
Official website: Mark Spragg

21st-century American novelists
American male novelists
Living people
University of Wyoming alumni
Novelists from Wyoming
1952 births
21st-century American male writers
20th-century American male writers
20th-century American non-fiction writers
American male non-fiction writers